Algotsson is a surname. Notable people with the surname include:

Håkan Algotsson (born 1966), Swedish ice hockey goaltender
Linda Algotsson (born 1972), Swedish equestrian
Matilda Algotsson (born 1998), Swedish figure skater
Sara Algotsson Ostholt (born 1974), Swedish equestrian